The JAC Heyue A30 is a subcompact car produced by JAC Motors that debuted on the 2012 Guangzhou Auto Show in China. Marketed as the JAC J4 in Latin America, the car is assembled in Mexico.

Overview 

The Heyue A30 was powered by a 1.5 liter inline-four engine producing 83kW and 146Nm of torque, with transmission options being either a 5-speed manual gearbox or a CVT.

The final production version of the JAC Heyue A30 debuted at the 2013 Shanghai Auto Show, and it was planned to be launched on May 28, 2013, but was later postponed to November 2013 with prices ranging from 62,800 to 82,000 yuan.
The Heyue A30 was discontinued in 2016 with the last price range before discontinuation ranging from 52,90 yuan to 76,900 yuan.

References

External links 

 

Heyue A30
Cars introduced in 2013
Front-wheel-drive vehicles
Subcompact cars
Sedans
Cars of China